Strzelecki may refer to:

People
Andrzej Strzelecki, Polish actor and academic teacher
Bolesław Strzelecki, Polish priest
Henri Strzelecki, British fashion designer
Henry Strzelecki, American musician
Paweł Strzelecki, Polish explorer and geologist
Peter Strzelecki, American baseball pitcher

Places

Australia

South Australia
 Strzelecki Desert, a desert 
 Strzelecki Desert Lakes Important Bird Area
 Strzelecki Regional Reserve, a protected area
 Strzelecki Track, a road

Tasmania
 Mount Strzelecki on Flinders Island,
 Strzelecki National Park, a protected area in Tasmania

Victoria
Strzelecki Highway, a highway 
Strzelecki railway line, a railway line 
Strzelecki railway station, a railway station associated with the railway line
 Strzelecki Ranges, a mountain range

Poland
 Strzelce County (Powiat strzelecki), an administrative region in south-west Poland
 Strzelce Landscape Park (Strzelecki Park Krajobrazowy), a protected area in east Poland

Fictional character
 Sharon Strzelecki, a character on the Australian TV series Kath & Kim